Ceanothus is a genus of about 50–60 species of nitrogen-fixing shrubs and small trees in the buckthorn family (Rhamnaceae). Common names for members of this genus are buckbrush, California lilac, soap bush, or just ceanothus.

The genus is native to North America with the highest diversity on the western coast. Some species (e.g., C. americanus) are restricted to the eastern United States and southeast Canada, and others (e.g., C. caeruleus) extend as far south as Guatemala.

Taxonomy and etymology
There are two subgenera within this genus: Ceanothus and Cerastes. The former clade is less drought-resistant, having bigger leaves. The evolution of these two clades likely started with a divergence in the niches filled in local communities, rather than a divergence on the basis of geography.

The Californian species of Ceanothus are commonly known collectively as California lilacs, with individual species having more descriptive common names. Species native elsewhere have other common names such as New Jersey tea for C. americanus, as its leaves were used as a black tea substitute during the American Revolution. In garden use, most are simply called by their scientific names or an adaptation of the scientific name, such as 'Maritime ceanothus' for C. maritimus.

Species

, accepted species are:

 Ceanothus americanus L. – New Jersey tea; red root
 Ceanothus arboreus Greene – feltleaf ceanothus
 Ceanothus arcuatus McMinn
 Ceanothus bolensis S.Boyd & J.E.Keeley
 Ceanothus buxifolius Willd. ex Schult. & Schult.f.
 Ceanothus caeruleus Lag
 Ceanothus confusus J.T. Howell – Rincon Ridge ceanothus
 Ceanothus connivens Greene – trailing buckbrush
 Ceanothus cordulatus Kellogg – whitethorn ceanothus
 Ceanothus crassifolius Torr. – hoaryleaf ceanothus
 Ceanothus cuneatus (Hook.) Nutt. – buckbrush
 subsp. cuneatus (Hook.) Nutt.
 subsp. fascicularis (McMinn) C.L.Schmidt
 subsp. rigidus (Nutt.) C.L.Schmidt
 subsp. sonomensis (Howell) C.L.Schmidt
 Ceanothus cyaneus Eastw. – San Diego buckbrush
 Ceanothus decornutus V.T.Parker
 Ceanothus dentatus Torr. & A.Gray – sandscrub ceanothus
 Ceanothus depressus Benth. – junco
 Ceanothus divergens Parry – Calistoga ceanothus 
 Ceanothus diversifolius Kellogg – pinemat
 Ceanothus fendleri A.Gray – Fendler's ceanothus
 Ceanothus ferrisiae McMinn – coyote ceanothus
 Ceanothus foliosus Parry – wavyleaf ceanothus
 subsp. foliosus Parry
 subsp. medius (McMinn) C.L.Schmidt
 subsp. vineatus (McMinn) C.L.Schmidt
 Ceanothus fresnensis Dudley ex Abrams – Fresno ceanothus
 Ceanothus gloriosus J.T. Howell – Point Reyes ceanothus
 subsp. exaltatus (Howell) C.L.Schmidt
 subsp. gloriosus J.T. Howell
 subsp. masonii (McMinn) C.L.Schmidt
 subsp. porrectus (Howell) C.L.Schmidt
 Ceanothus griseus (Trel. ex B.L.Rob.) McMinn – Carmel ceanothus
 Ceanothus hearstiorum Hoover & J.B.Roof – Hearst Ranch buckbrush
 Ceanothus herbaceus Raf. – Jersey tea
 Ceanothus impressus Trel. – Santa Barbara ceanothus
 Ceanothus incanus Torr. & A.Gray – coast whitethorn
 Ceanothus integerrimus Hook. & Arn. – deerbrush ceanothus
 Ceanothus jepsonii Greene – Jepson ceanothus
 subsp. albiflorus (Howell) C.L.Schmidt
 subsp. jepsonii Greene
 Ceanothus lanuginosus (M.E.Jones) Rose
 Ceanothus lemmonii Parry – Lemmon's ceanothus
 Ceanothus leucodermis Greene – chaparral whitethorn
 Ceanothus maritimus Hoover – maritime ceanothus
 Ceanothus martinii M.E.Jones – Martin's ceanothus
 Ceanothus masonii McMinn – Mason's ceanothus
 Ceanothus megacarpus Nutt. – bigpod ceanothus
 subsp. insularis (Eastw.) P.H.Raven
 subsp. megacarpus Nutt.
 Ceanothus microphyllus Michx. – littleleaf buckbrush
 Ceanothus ochraceus Suess.
 Ceanothus oliganthus Nutt. – hairy ceanothus
 subsp. oliganthus Nutt.
 subsp. sorediatus (Hook. & Arn.) C.L.Schmidt
 Ceanothus ophiochilus Boyd, Ross & Arnseth – Vail Lake ceanothus
 Ceanothus otayensis H. E. McMinn – Otay Mountain buckbrush
 Ceanothus palmeri Trel. – Palmer ceanothus
 Ceanothus papillosus Torr. & A.Gray – wartleaf ceanothus
 Ceanothus parryi Trel. – Parry Ceanothus
 Ceanothus parvifolius (S.Watson) Trel. – littleleaf ceanothus
 Ceanothus pauciflorus DC.
 Ceanothus pendletonensis D.O.Burge, Rebman, & M.R.Mulligan
 Ceanothus perplexans Trel.
 Ceanothus pinetorum Coville – Coville ceanothus
 Ceanothus prostratus Benth. – prostrate ceanothus
 subsp. confusus (Howell) C.L.Schmidt
 subsp. prostratus Benth.
 subsp. pumilus (Greene) C.L.Schmidt
 Ceanothus pumilus Greene – dwarf ceanothus
 Ceanothus purpureus Jepson – hollyleaf ceanothus
 subsp. divergens (Parry) C.L.Schmidt
 subsp. purpureus Jepson
 Ceanothus roderickii Knight – Pine Hill buckbrush
 Ceanothus sanguineus Pursh – redstem ceanothus
 Ceanothus serpyllifolius Nutt. – Coastal Plain buckbrush
 Ceanothus sonomensis J.T. Howell – Sonoma ceanothus
 Ceanothus spinosus Nutt. – green bark ceanothus
 Ceanothus thyrsiflorus Eschsch. – blueblossom
 Ceanothus tomentosus Parry – woolyleaf ceanothus
 Ceanothus velutinus Dougl. ex Hook. – snowbrush ceanothus
 subsp. laevigatus (Torr. & A.Gray) Piper & Beattie
 subsp. velutinus Dougl. ex Hook.
 Ceanothus verrucosus Nutt. – Barranca brush

Species names with uncertain taxonomic status
The status of the following species is unresolved:

 Ceanothus atropurpureus Raf.
 Ceanothus chloroxylon Nees
 Ceanothus collinus Douglas ex Knowles & Westc.
 Ceanothus cuneatus A.Gray
 Ceanothus cuneatus K.Brandegee
 Ceanothus divergens Poepp. ex Endl.
 Ceanothus elongatus Salisb.
 Ceanothus flexilis McMinn
 Ceanothus glaber Spach
 Ceanothus laevigatus Howell
 Ceanothus lancifolius Moench
 Ceanothus leschenaultii DC.
 Ceanothus mocinianus DC.
 Ceanothus mystacinus DC.
 Ceanothus neumannii Tausch
 Ceanothus oblanceolatus Davidson
 Ceanothus pauciflorus Moc. & Sessé ex DC.
 Ceanothus pubiflorus DC.
 Ceanothus pulchellus Delile ex Spach
 Ceanothus scandens D.Dietr.
 Ceanothus spathulatus Labill.
 Ceanothus spinosus Torr. & A. Gray
 Ceanothus triqueter Wall.
 Ceanothus vanrensselaeri Roof

Hybrids
The following hybrids have been described:

 Ceanothus × arcuatus McMinn
 Ceanothus × bakeri Greene ex McMinn
 Ceanothus × flexilis McMinn
 Ceanothus × lobbianus Hook.
 Ceanothus × lorenzenii (Jeps.) McMinn
 Ceanothus × mendocinensis McMinn
 Ceanothus × otayensis McMinn
 Ceanothus × rugosus Greene
 Ceanothus × serrulatus McMinn
 Ceanothus × vanrensselaeri Roof
 Ceanothus × veitchianus Hook.

Hybrid names with uncertain taxonomic status
The status of the following hybrids is unresolved:

 Ceanothus × arnoldii Dippel
 Ceanothus × burkwoodii auct.
 Ceanothus × burtonensis Renss.
 Ceanothus × cyam L.W.Lenz
 Ceanothus × delilianus Spach
 Ceanothus × humboldtensis Roof
 Ceanothus × intermedius Koehne
 Ceanothus × pallidus Koehne
 Ceanothus × pallidus Lindl.
 Ceanothus × roseus Koehne

Description

Growth pattern
The majority  of the species are evergreen, but the handful of species adapted to cold winters are deciduous. The leaves are opposite or alternate (depending on species), small (typically 1–5 cm long), simple, and mostly with serrated margins.

Leaves and stems
Ceanothus leaves may be arranged opposite to each other on the stem, or alternate. Alternate leaves may have either one or three main veins rising from the base of the leaf.

The leaves have a shiny upper surface that feels "gummy" when pinched between the thumb and forefinger, and the roots of most species have red inner root bark.

Flowers and fruit

The flowers are white, greenish–white, blue, dark purple-blue, pale purple or pink, maturing into a dry, three-lobed seed capsule.

The flowers are tiny and fragrant and produced in large, dense clusters. A few species are reported to be so intensely fragrant they are almost nauseating, and are said to resemble the odor of "boiling honey in an enclosed area". The seeds of this plant can lie dormant for hundreds of years, and Ceanothus species are typically dependent on forest fires to trigger germination of their seeds.

Fruits are hard, nutlike capsules.

Distribution

These plants are profusely distributed throughout the Rocky Mountains from British Columbia south through Colorado, the Cascades of Oregon and California, and the Coastal Ranges of California.

Ceanothus velutinus is perhaps the most widespread member of this genus, occurring through much of western North America. The plants in this genus often co-occur with one another, especially when they are more distantly related.

Uses

Wildlife
Ceanothus is a good source of nutrition for deer, specifically mule deer along the West Coast of the United States. However, the leaves are not as nutritious from late spring to early fall as they are in early spring. Porcupines and quail have also been seen eating stems and seeds of these shrubs. The leaves are a good source of protein and the stems and leaves have been found to contain a high amount of calcium.

Cultivation
Many Ceanothus species are popular ornamental plants for gardens. Dozens of hybrids and cultivars have been selected, such as flexible ceanothus, Ceanothus × flexilis (C. cuneatus × C. prostratus).

AGM cultivars
The following cultivars and hybrids have gained the Royal Horticultural Society's Award of Garden Merit: 

’Autumnal Blue’ 
'Blue Mound' 
'Burkwoodii' 
'Cascade' 
'Concha' 
'Dark Star' 
'Gloire de Versailles' 
'Mystery Blue' 
'Perle Rose' 
'Puget Blue' 
'Skylark' 
'Topaze' 
'Trewithen Blue' 
C. thyrsifolius var. repens  

Other cultivars available include:-

There are also more cultivars and hybrids of Ceanothus arboreus, Ceanothus griseus horizontalis (groundcovers), and Ceanothus thyrsiflorus in the nursery trade.

Propagation
Propagation of ceanothus is by seed, following scarification and stratification. Seeds are soaked in water for 12 hours followed by chilling at 1 °C for one to three months. It can also sprout from roots and/or stems. Seeds are stored in plant litter in large quantities. It is estimated that there are about two million seeds per acre in forest habitats. Seeds are dispersed propulsively from capsules and, it has been estimated, can remain viable for hundreds of years. In habitat, the seeds of plants in this genus germinate only in response to range fires and forest fires.

Other uses
Native Americans used the dried leaves of this plant as an herbal tea, and early pioneers used the plant as a substitute for black tea. Miwok Indians of California made baskets from Ceanothus branches. Ceanothus integerrimus has been used by North American tribes to ease childbirth.

Nitrogen fixation 
Ceanothus is actinorhizal, meaning it fixes nitrogen through a symbiotic relationship with Frankia. Six genera within Rhamnaceae are actinorhizal, but Ceanothus is the only genus not in the monophyletic tribe Colletieae. This suggests that actinorhizal symbiosis may have evolved twice in Rhamnaceae. Frankia forms nodules on the roots of Ceanothus, converting atmospheric nitrogen into ammonia using nitrogenase.

References

 
Rhamnaceae genera
Flora of North America
Taxa named by Carl Linnaeus
Garden plants of North America
Drought-tolerant plants
Saponaceous plants
Flora of California